Arpa-Tektir is a village in Osh Region of Kyrgyzstan. It is part of the Alay District. Its population was 2,389 in 2021.

References

Populated places in Osh Region